János Göröcs (8 May 1939 – 23 February 2020) was a Hungarian footballer. He played for the club Újpesti Dózsa as a striker and a midfielder, and later for Tatabányai Bányász. He played 62 games and scored 19 goals for the Hungary national football team.

Göröcs was born in Gánt. He was best-known for his participation in the bronze medal winning Hungarian team on the 1960 Summer Olympic Games and for playing on the 1962 FIFA World Cup. He later became trainer of Újpest.

References

External links
 
 

1939 births
2020 deaths
Hungarian footballers
Hungarian football managers
Újpest FC players
Újpest FC managers
1962 FIFA World Cup players
Hungary international footballers
Olympic footballers of Hungary
Footballers at the 1960 Summer Olympics
Olympic bronze medalists for Hungary
Olympic medalists in football
Medalists at the 1960 Summer Olympics
Sportspeople from Fejér County
Association football midfielders
Nemzeti Bajnokság I managers